Demir Demirev (born 31 August 1984) is a Bulgarian weightlifter. He is of Turkish ethnicity. He participated in the men's -69 kg class at the 2006 World Weightlifting Championships and won the bronze medal, finishing behind Vencelas Dabaya and Shi Zhiyong. He snatched 143 kg and clean and jerked an additional 175 kg for a total of 318 kg, 14 kg behind winner Dabaya.

At the 2007 World Weightlifting Championships he won the bronze medal in the 69 kg category with a total of 334 kg.

Demirev tested positive for a steroid in 2008 during an out-of-competition test, along with ten other weightlifters and therefore Bulgaria's weightlifting federation withdrew its team from the 2008 Summer Olympics in Beijing, China.

References 

1984 births
Living people
Bulgarian male weightlifters
Bulgarian people of Turkish descent
Bulgarian sportspeople in doping cases
Doping cases in weightlifting
Place of birth missing (living people)
European Weightlifting Championships medalists
World Weightlifting Championships medalists